Gideon Glick (born June 6, 1988) is an American actor. His Broadway work includes the role of Ernst in the musical Spring Awakening, Jimmy-6 in Spider-Man: Turn Off the Dark, Jordan Berman in Significant Other, and most recently Dill Harris in Aaron Sorkin's adaptation of Harper Lee's To Kill a Mockingbird, for which he was nominated for the Tony Award for Best Featured Actor in a Play. His film and TV work includes Ocean's 8, The Detour, Devious Maids, and Alfie in the fourth season of The Marvelous Mrs. Maisel.

Early life
Glick was born into a Jewish family in Philadelphia, and raised by professors who met initially at Hebrew University in Israel. His father is dentist and researcher Michael Glick. Gideon has been deaf in his right ear since birth. During his senior year of high school, he moved to New York City to originate the role of Ernst in the hit musical Spring Awakening. He attended Jack M. Barrack Hebrew Academy, Lower Merion High School and New York University, where he studied art history.

Career
Glick's first major role was playing Ernst, an adolescent boy in love with his classmate, Hanschen, in the original cast of the hit musical Spring Awakening. The play premiered at the Atlantic Theatre Company Off-Broadway, but later transferred along with co-stars Jonathan Groff, John Gallagher Jr. and Lea Michele, to the Eugene O'Neill Theatre on Broadway. The same year, Glick made his silver screen debut as Slap in the film One Last Thing... alongside Cynthia Nixon and Ethan Hawke.

His next major theater role was as Howie in Speech & Debate (Roundabout Underground), a play by Stephen Karam. The play began in October 2007 and ran until early 2008.

Glick returned to Broadway in the role of Jimmy-6, a member of the four-person Geek Chorus in Julie Taymor's Broadway production of Spider-Man: Turn Off the Dark. However, Glick and the rest of the Geek Chorus were cut after Taymor was forced out as director. After co-starring in MCC's production of Wild Animals You Should Know, Glick went on to portray Jack in The Public Theater's production of Stephen Sondheim's Into the Woods alongside Amy Adams and Denis O'Hare.

In 2014, Glick was profiled in The New York Times for his lauded performance as Matthew in The Few by Samuel D. Hunter. He then was cast in his first recurring role as Ty McKay, the second season villain, on Devious Maids on Lifetime.

His first starring role was in Significant Other as Jordan Berman, alongside Barbara Barrie. The play was written by Joshua Harmon and premiered at Roundabout Theatre Company's Laura Pels Theater in 2015. The highly acclaimed, sold-out production transferred to Broadway's Booth Theater in 2016. He received a Drama League Award nomination for this performance. He next played Kyle McCallister in the Warner Bros. feature film, Ocean's 8, which was followed by a recurring role on The Detour on TBS.

He starred in Aaron Sorkin's 2018 stage adaptation of the novel To Kill a Mockingbird, alongside Jeff Daniels as Atticus Finch, produced by Scott Rudin. Glick played Dill Harris, the visiting friend of Scout and Jem Finch. The role is modeled on Harper Lee's childhood best friend, Truman Capote. In January 2020, Glick assumed the role of Seymour in the off-Broadway revival of Little Shop of Horrors; he had previously portrayed the role in a temporary capacity for two weeks in November 2019.

Personal life 
Glick is gay and came out early in 7th grade. He married hospitalist Perry Dubin in November 2019.

Filmography

Film

Television

Stage appearances 

Staged readings and concerts

 2009: How Can You Run with a Shell on Your Back? (An Aesop's Fables Musical) – New Worlds Stages (21st Annual Festival of New Musicals)
 2010: Sons of the Prophet – Susan Stein Shiva Theater (Powerhouse Theater)
 2018: The Destiny of Me (Alexander) – Lucille Lortel Theatre

Other media

Awards and nominations

References

External links
 
 
 Gideon Glick at the Internet Off-Broadway Database
 Gideon Glick at About the Artists
 Oasis Journals Interview

1988 births
21st-century American male actors
Actors with disabilities
American male stage actors
American people with disabilities
American gay actors
Jewish American male actors
LGBT Jews
LGBT people from Pennsylvania
Living people
Male actors from Philadelphia
New York University Institute of Fine Arts alumni
21st-century American Jews